Melanocercops phractopa is a moth of the family Gracillariidae. It is known from India (Bihar) and Japan (the Ryukyu Islands).

The wingspan is 5.2-6.8 mm.

The larvae feed on Ficus benghalensis, Ficus indica, Ficus infectoria and Ficus microcarpa. They probably mine the leaves of their host plant.

References

Acrocercopinae
Moths of Asia
Moths of Japan
Moths described in 1918